Chrysanthos Panas (Greek: Χρύσανθος Πανάς; born 16 November 1968) is a Greek businessman, art collector, author of Greek Islands book by Assouline and philanthropist from Athens. In his native country he is mainly known as the owner of restaurants and clubs in Athens city center and the southern suburbs (the latter also known as Athens Riviera).

Biography 
Panas was born in 1968 in Athens, Greece and grew up in the seaside suburb of Vouliagmeni. He is a descendant of the noble Panas family of Cephalonia which origins are traced back to the 16th century. A graduate of Deree the American College of Greece (Bachelor's Degree), Panas is married to jewelry designer Elena Syraka and he is father of one child, the artist Lil Koni.

Business career 
Chrysanthos Panas started his involvement in business at a young age along with his older brother Spyros, when they took over the management of a beach bar within Nautical Club of Vouliagmeni facilities.  Later in 1992 the two siblings founded the Panas Group Sophisticated Hospitality. Over the years, Panas Group got the ownership and management of various restaurants and clubs in the greater Athens region.

Other activities 
Starting in 1990, Panas managed to acquire an art collection of over 300 artworks of various artists including Marina Abramović, Stephen Antonakos, George Bouzianis, and Thomas Helbig. He is also a member of the Advisory Committee concerning Artistic Issues of Michael Cacoyannis Foundation.

Since 2016 he is a donor to the Greek charitable organization ELEPAP-Rehabilitation for The Disabled (Greek: ΕΛΕΠΑΠ). In 2018 he was awarded by the president of Elpida Association of Friends of Children with Cancer, Marianna Vardinogiannis for supporting children with neoplastic disease.

References 

1968 births
Living people
Businesspeople from Athens
Greek art collectors
Greek philanthropists
Athens University of Economics and Business alumni
People from East Attica